Sri Lanka Cricket Combined XI was a Sri Lankan Twenty20 cricket team. The team was established in 2010 and featured only in the 2009–10 Inter-Provincial Twenty20 of the Inter-Provincial Twenty20, in which they came last. The team was captained by Hans Fernando.

History

2009–10 Inter-Provincial Twenty20

Players

Squad

Notable players

 Andri Berenger
 Bhanuka Rajapaksa
 Demintha Dahanayake
 Dhanushka Gunathilleke
 Rumesh Buddika
 Sanjaya Fernando

Honours

Domestic

Twenty20
Inter-Provincial Twenty20: 0

References

Former senior cricket clubs of Sri Lanka